William Nelson (born 18 December 1948) is an English singer, guitarist, songwriter, producer, painter, video artist, writer and experimental musician. He rose to prominence as the chief songwriter, vocalist and guitarist of the rock group Be-Bop Deluxe, which he formed in 1972. Nelson has been described as  "one of the most underrated guitarists of the seventies art rock movement". In 2015, he was recognised with the Visionary award at the Progressive Music Awards.

Early life and personal life
Nelson was born in Wakefield in the West Riding of Yorkshire, to Jean and Walter Nelson. Walter Nelson was an alto saxophone player who led his own dance band, and Jean a member of a dance troupe when younger. Bill Nelson attended local schools in the Wakefield area and in the 1960s went to Wakefield College of Art. Nelson's younger brother, Ian (1956–2006), collaborated on the Be-Bop Deluxe song "Ships in the Night" and formed the band Fiat Lux; he also played on the 1979 Red Noise album Sound-on-Sound and with the 2004 touring band Bill Nelson and the Lost Satellites.

Nelson has three children, Julia (born 1970 with Bill’s first wife, Shirley) and Elle (born 1978) and Elliot (born 1981), both born with Bill’s second wife, Jan. Elle and Elliot played in their own band, Honeytone Cody, between the late 1990s and 2014. Some time around April 1995 Nelson married Emiko, who was previously married to Yellow Magic Orchestra drummer Yukihiro Takahashi.

Career

1970s
Nelson was educated at the Wakefield College of Art, where he developed an interest in the work of poet and filmmaker Jean Cocteau. At this time he was also developing as a musician, drawing upon Duane Eddy as a primary guitar influence.

His first record was a brief contribution on the album A-Austr: Musics from Holyground, with Brian Calvert, Chris Coombs, Ted Hepworth, Mike Levon and Brian Wilson. Levon recorded and produced the album which appeared on Levon's own Holyground Records label in 1970. After that, Nelson appeared in a much more substantial role with Lightyears Away on Astral Navigations released in 1971. On one track, "Yesterday", written by Coombs, Levon recorded Nelson's lead guitars in an acid rock style, supporting Coombs' stylophone riff. This track also gave Nelson his first airplay by John Peel on his national BBC Radio 1 programme in the United Kingdom. Nelson's Holyground recordings were released in February 2001 as Electrotype.

In 1973, Nelson's debut solo album Northern Dream, released on his own independent Smile label, drew further attention from Peel which eventually led to Nelson's band Be-Bop Deluxe signing to EMI's Harvest Records subsidiary and releasing Axe Victim in 1974. Nelson replaced the original band members for Futurama in 1975. The lineup of Bill Nelson (guitar), Andrew Clark (keyboards), Charlie Tumahai (bass) and Simon Fox (drums) recorded Sunburst Finish and Modern Music in 1976, the live album Live! In The Air Age in 1977 and their final studio album Drastic Plastic in 1978.

Nelson found the structure of a permanent band constricting.  An instrumental on Drastic Plastic performed by Nelson (acoustic guitar) and Clark (keyboards) anticipated Nelson's later solo ambient work. Other tracks on that album required Fox record drum parts for use as repeating loop backing tracks in the studio. (Performing these songs live on the subsequent tour, Fox would physically play these repeating patterns on drums). This sowed the seeds for later experimentation by Nelson. 1983's Invisibility Exhibition tour would see Bill Nelson (guitar) and Ian Nelson (sax) improvise to the former's self-produced backing audio (and video) tracks (later released as the Chamber of Dreams album), an approach Nelson would repeat for many solo live performances throughout his career. Playing the guitar over pre-recorded backing tracks would bear further fruit in later studio recordings, notably the Painting With Guitars series (2003, 2015) and And We Fell into A Dream (2007).

In autumn 1978, Nelson halted the Be-Bop Deluxe project, removed Tumahai and Fox from his immediate working band and replaced the name with the moniker Red Noise (releasing the Sound-on-Sound album in February 1979). Harvest, who had insisted on naming it "Bill Nelson's Red Noise", refused to release the second Red Noise album Quit Dreaming And Get on the Beam which was largely recorded by Nelson with contributions on sax from his brother Ian rather than the more-obviously marketable five-piece band Harvest's execs had understandably expected. The record remained unreleased in record company limbo.

Meanwhile, with his producer from Harvest John Leckie, Nelson did some production (and, in Nelson's case, sessions keyboards) work for the band Skids, whose guitarist Stuart Adamson was an admirer of Nelson's musicianship. Fruitful friendships followed. Vocalist Richard Jobson would appear as a support act reading poetry on the Invisibility Exhibition tour. After Adamson's death in 2001, Nelson composed a piece in memory of his departed friend, called simply "For Stuart", which appeared on 2003's The Romance of Sustain Volume One: Painting With Guitars and (in a live version) on 2011's live at Metropolis Studios DVD.

1980s

Nelson's manager Mark Rye negotiated with Harvest to buy back some of the unreleased songs for Nelson to release under his own name on his own label, Cocteau Records, which Nelson and Rye had set up. Consequently, in July 1980, Nelson was able to release the single "Do You Dream in Colour?", which after airplay on BBC Radio 1 reached No. 52 in the UK Singles Chart. This debut release on the label persuaded Phonogram to acquire the remaining tracks for Cocteau in order to release Quit Dreaming And Get on the Beam as a Bill Nelson album on their subsidiary label Mercury Records in 1981. The release contained bonus disc Sounding The Ritual Echo (Atmospheres for Dreaming) featuring experimental, ambient instrumentals which Nelson had recorded privately at his home. Subsequent Mercury releases included The Love That Whirls, which included a bonus disc of Nelson's soundtrack for The Yorkshire Actors' stage production of Jean Cocteau's 1946 film La Belle et la Bête/Beauty and the Beast. Nelson had already contributed music (and released it under the title Das Kabinet on Cocteau) to the same company's similar adaptation of Robert Wiene's 1920 silent film classic The Cabinet of Dr. Caligari.

Freed from the demands of a mainstream, commercial record company, Nelson released considerable quantities of singles and LPs on Cocteau throughout the decade, much of it by himself but also a number of singles by other artists, notably Last Man in Europe, A Flock of Seagulls, The Revox Cadets, Richard Jobson, Q (16), Fiat Lux, Man Jumping and Yukihiro Takahashi. The more ambitious Cocteau releases by Nelson himself included the four-LP box set of experimental electronic music Trial by Intimacy (The Book of Splendours) and the later ambient two-LP collection Chance Encounters in the Garden of Lights, which contained music informed by Nelson's Gnostic beliefs. In 1989, he released the 4-CD box set Demonstrations of Affection.

He was hired by English new wave artist Gary Numan to produce his 1983 album Warriors, with Numan saying that Bill Nelson was his "favourite guitar player, bar none." However, the two musicians failed to maintain a working relationship, and ultimately Nelson chose not to be credited for his production role on the album. Nelson also contributed towards several tracks on David Sylvian's Gone to Earth (1986). Nelson was commissioned by Channel 4 to write music for the 1987 television drama series Brond.

In the 1980s a deal with CBS Records' Portrait imprint failed, leaving the one album Getting the Holy Ghost Across (US title: On a Blue Wing) with further tracks from that album's sessions issued on the UK mini-LP Living for the Spangled Moment. In the late 1980s, Nelson signed to Enigma Records, which went out of business shortly after re-releasing his entire Cocteau catalogue.

As the decade ended, Nelson suffered a series of personal setbacks, including a divorce, tax problems and an acrimonious dispute with his manager over his back catalogue rights. In the case of one album, the unreleased Simplex, Nelson discovered his manager had been selling copies via mail order without Nelson's authorisation or knowledge; Nelson claimed he never received any royalties from these sales.

1990s

In 1992, Nelson released Blue Moons and Laughing Guitars on Virgin which consisted of demos for a proposed band including four guitarists and two drummers which never materialised. "This is what I do behind locked doors," he wrote on the sleeve, prefiguring much of his later, home recorded work including My Secret Studio (4-CD + 2-CD) and Noise Candy (6-CD). In the same year, Nelson worked with Roger Eno and Kate St John as producer (with Roger Eno) on the duo's album The Familiar, on which Nelson also played guitar and other instruments. This experience fortuitously not only sowed the seeds of Eno's, Nelson's and St.John's participation in the 'ambient supergroup' Channel Light Vessel, which also featured Laraaji and Mayumi Tachibana, but also introduced Nelson to Voiceprint Records, whose subsidiary labels included All Saints and Resurgence, both of which would release a number of CLV and Nelson recordings over the next few years.

In 1995, Nelson released two very different albums. Crimsworth (Flowers, Stones, Fountains And Flames) was an ambient piece which had provided the soundscape to an art installation. Practically Wired, or How I Became... Guitarboy! was a return to guitar-based instrumental music, something Nelson had barely touched for the previous decade and a half.

In 1996, Nelson augmented his sound with drum and bass for After The Satellite Sings, credited as a major influence on David Bowie's Earthling album by Bowie's then guitarist Reeves Gabrels.

By 1996, Nelson's troubles with his former manager were resolved in a lawsuit which enabled Nelson to recover much of his back catalogue. The fully authorised Simplex was subsequently released in 2001 by Lenin Imports and reissued in 2012 by Esoteric.

In the late 1990s, Nelson created the Populuxe label, with a distribution arrangement via Robert Fripp's Discipline Global Mobile, but his relationship with them stagnated and Nelson's last release on that label was Atom Shop in 1998. Subsequent releases have been on other imprints such as Toneswoon as well as direct mail order (and later internet order) releases.

2000s
2002 saw the release of EP Three White Roses & A Budd (with Fila Brazillia and Harold Budd) on Twentythree Records,.

In 2001, Nelson attended a first Nelsonica convention, set up in West Yorkshire by fans in his honour, taking with him drawings to sell to any interested parties. It proved such a good experience that he resolved to contribute live music performances, dedicated CDs of new material, and anything else that seemed appropriate, to any such future events. Nelsonica became an annual fixture in his calendar for the next decade or so. Attendees at 2002's Nelsonica 02 received a copy of Astral Motel, the first convention CD release. Honeytone Cody played one set, Nelson and his brother Ian played a second, while Nelson's newly assembled seven piece band The Lost Satellites, which also included Ian, played a third. It was a resounding success and an annual institution was born.

Three further albums followed in 2003: The Romance of Sustain Volume One: Painting With Guitars, Plaything, and a second Nelsonica CD Luxury Lodge,. Since then, Nelson has released an average of four albums a year, often in small runs which soon go out of print. He has accomplished this using his own series of branded record labels: Almost Opaque then Discs of Ancient Odeon for the Nelsonica releases; Universal Twang then Sonoluxe for the others. (Nelson's Sonic Masonic imprint lasted for only one release, 2004's Satellite Songs)

Nelson's in-house releasing was made possible by the financial backing of Sound on Sound magazine, whose website hosts his online shop and is named after Red Noise's Sound-on-Sound album. In 2004, the magazine also put up the money for Nelson to take his band Bill Nelson and the Lost Satellites on tour around the UK as The Be-Bop Deluxe And Beyond Tour.

Nelson pursued different artistic directions. Two Rosewood releases contained acoustic guitar pieces "submitted to electronic and digital processing." The highly personal The Alchemical Adventures of Sailor Bill, was a concept album about the English coastline, ships and the sea, while its more ambient, instrumental companion piece Neptune's Galaxy comprised five long form instrumental compositions exploring the same subject. Of the former, Nelson wrote, "this set of songs comes (closer) to being personally fulfilling as almost any other album of mine." Most of the decade's remaining albums were lead electric guitar-oriented and non-vocal. Improvisation against pre-recorded backing tracks played a major role in And We Fell into A Dream while the very different Theatre of Falling Leaves eschewed lead guitar in favour of keyboards. The decade closed with more voice-based material as Nelson crooned through Golden Melodies of Tomorrow, delivered more familiar rock and ballad vocals on Fancy Planets and delved into romantic songwriting in The Dream Transmission Pavilion.

In the first half of the decade, Nelson published his collected online diaries from 1999–2003 under the moniker diary of a hyperdreamer. A second volume covering entries from 2005–2006 would appear in 2015. The last ten years of this diary remain on his official website to this day. He also gave extensive interviews to biographer Paul Sutton Reeves for a book, the publication of which was put on hold for around two years when publisher Sean Body died. Music in Dreamland Bill Nelson & Be-Bop Deluxe, finally materialised in 2008.

In the second half of the decade, Nelson's live performances (mostly at the Nelsonica events) broadened out from solo work to encompass two other bands. One was the improvisational, three-piece Orchestra Futura consisting of Nelson, Dave Sturt (bass) and Theo Travis (assorted woodwind, brass). (The duo of Sturt and Travis already played together as Cipher.) The other was the more conventional rock oriented, seven-piece Bill Nelson and the Gentlemen Rocketeers (again including Sturt and Travis) which played songs with vocals from the extensive Nelson/Be-Bop Deluxe back catalogue.

By 2006, Universal Music (UK) had re-issued three Mercury albums: Quit Dreaming and Get on the Beam, The Love that Whirls and Chimera had all been remastered and released with bonus tracks. Sonoluxe had reissued the CBS album Getting the Holy Ghost Across / On a Blue Wing with all the original tracks including those from Living for the Spangled Moment.

2010s

In 2010, Nelson published the first part of an autobiography.

In March 2011, motivated by a desire to capture the flavour of recent gigs on film for posterity via DVD release, Bill Nelson and the Gentlemen Rocketeers played a concert of songs spanning Nelson's career before a live audience in front of in-house cameras at Metropolis Studios, London. Dissatisfied with the resultant sound mix, Nelson remixed it himself at his own expense. Using Nelson's remix, ITV Studios Home Entertainment released a DVD of the event. This initial release quickly sold out. A promised television broadcast of the recording only materialised in a few selected territories, excluding the UK. The video and audio recording has subsequently been reissued on other formats including CD and LP. However, having signed away his rights to these recordings, Nelson has made no money on these releases.

In 2011, Cherry Red Records' subsidiary Esoteric Recordings commenced a roll-out re-release of Nelson's back catalogue for many of his releases between 1981 and 2002 with the 8-CD compilation The Practice of Everyday Life which covered 40 years of recordings. Other notable reissues have included the 4-CD The Book of Splendours and the 6-CD Noise Candy,. The Esoteric deal did not involve a rights buyout, so Nelson is properly compensated for these reissues.

In 2013, Nelson finally began releasing his out of print CD back catalogue from 2002 onwards as digital downloads via Bandcamp. On this platform he subsequently released the three volume compilation The Dreamer's Companion in 2014 and brand new albums commencing with Special Metal from 2016 onwards.

In addition to his numerous solo releases of recent years, Nelson has also made both film soundtracks and a number of collaborative recordings with other artists. In 2010, he released the soundtrack to the US TV documentary American Stamps as Picture Post while in 2014, he released the soundtrack to UK director Daisy Asquith's paean to cycling Velorama (a tie in with the 2014 Tour de France cycle race which went through Yorkshire) as Pedalscope. In 2012, Nelson finally completed The Last of the Neon Cynics, a long standing project with comic artist Matt Howarth: the latter supplied a comic (a PDF file) while the former provided a soundtrack to it. In 2014, he collaborated with fellow guitarist Reeves Gabrels (who has also worked with David Bowie and The Cure) on Fantastic Guitars.

In 2014, Nelson suffered a complete hearing loss in his right ear. This put a stop to any plans for playing live (and by extension Nelsonica events built around live performance) for the foreseeable future. Yet he continued to record and release music despite this disability. The first album to be affected was Quiet Bells. According to Nelson's sleeve notes, "to slowly adjust to this problem, I decided to make an album that features mainly guitar, a gentle collection of instrumentals in a neo-minimalist, ambient style."

In 2014, Nelson was honoured by Wakefield Council with a Hollywood-style star on the city’s walk of fame. He also designed an extremely limited edition 'Astroluxe Custom Ltd' guitar for the Eastwood company.

In 2016, 46 years after recording his debut album, Nelson released a sequel entitled New Northern Dream.

Discography

Albums

solo before Be-Bop Deluxe
 Northern Dream (1971) Smile
 Electrotype – The Holyground Recordings 1968–1972 (2001) Holyground (includes pre-Harvest Be-Bop Deluxe recordings)

with Be-Bop Deluxe
 Axe Victim (1974) Harvest
 Futurama (1975) Harvest
 Sunburst Finish (1976) Harvest
 Modern Music (1976) Harvest
 Live! In The Air Age (1977) Harvest
 Drastic Plastic (1978) Harvest
 The Best of and the Rest of Be-Bop Deluxe (1978) Harvest
 Radioland (1994) BBC Radio 1 live in concert 1976 Windsong
 Tramcar To Tomorrow (1998) John Peel BBC Radio 1 Sessions 1974-8 Hux
 Tremulous Antenna (2002) Radioland remastered Hux

with Bill Nelson's Red Noise
   Furniture Music (1977)
 Sound-on-Sound (1979) Harvest

with Orchestra Arcana
 Iconography (1986) Cocteau
 Optimism (1988) Cocteau

with Channel Light Vessel
 Automatic (1994) Channel Light Vessel All Saints
 Excellent Spirits (1996) Channel Light Vessel All Saints

solo after Be-Bop Deluxe/Bill Nelson's Red Noise

 Quit Dreaming and Get on the Beam (1981) Mercury
 Sounding the Ritual Echo (Atmospheres for Dreaming) (1981) Mercury
 Das Kabinet (1981) Cocteau
 The Love That Whirls (Diary of a Thinking Heart) (1982) Mercury
 La Belle et la Bête (1982) Mercury
 Chimera mini-LP (1983) Mercury
 Savage Gestures for Charm's Sake (1983) Cocteau
 The Two-Fold Aspect of Everything (1984) Cocteau
 Trial by Intimacy (The Book of Splendours) – The Summer of God's Piano (1985) Cocteau
 Trial by Intimacy (The Book of Splendours)  – Chamber of Dreams (Music from the Invisibility Exhibition) (1985) Cocteau
 Trial by Intimacy (The Book of Splendours)  – Pavilions of the Heart And Soul (1985) Cocteau
 Trial by Intimacy (The Book of Splendours)  – A Catalogue of Obsessions (1985) Cocteau
 Chameleon (The Music of Bill Nelson) (1985) Themes International Music
 Getting the Holy Ghost Across (1986) Portrait
 Living for the Spangled Moment mini-LP (1986) Portrait
 On a Blue Wing (1986) US version of Getting the Holy Ghost Across – different cover, slightly different track listing Portrait
 Map of Dreams (1987) Cocteau
 Chance Encounters in the Garden of Lights – The Angel at the Western Window (1987) Cocteau
 Chance Encounters in the Garden of Lights – The Book of Inward Conversation (1987) Cocteau
 Demonstrations of Affection  – Chimes And Rings (1989) Cocteau
 Demonstrations of Affection  – Nudity (1989) Cocteau
 Demonstrations of Affection  – Heartbreakland (1989) Cocteau
 Demonstrations of Affection  – Details (1989) Cocteau
 Simplex (1990) Cocteau
 Duplex (1990) double CD compilation Cocteau
 Altar Pieces (1990) limited edition audio cassette The Orpheus Organisation
 Luminous (1991) Imaginary
 Blue Moons & Laughing Guitars (1992) Virgin
 Crimsworth (Flowers, Stones, Fountains And Flames) (1995) Resurgence
 Practically Wired or how I became…Guitarboy! (1995) All Saints
 My Secret Studio Volume I – Buddha Head (1995) Resurgence
 My Secret Studio Volume I – Electricity Made Us Angels (1995) Resurgence
 My Secret Studio Volume I – Deep Dream Decoder (1995) Resurgence
 My Secret Studio Volume I – Juke Box for Jet Boy (1995) Resurgence
 After The Satellite Sings (1996) Resurgence
 Confessions of a Hyperdreamer: My Secret Studio Volume II – Weird Critters (1997) Populuxe
 Confessions of a Hyperdreamer: My Secret Studio Volume II – Magnificent Dream People (1997) Populuxe
 Atom Shop (1998) Discipline Global Mobile
 Whistling While The World Turns (2000) Lenin Imports
 Noise Candy – Old Man Future Blows The Blues (2002) Toneswoon
 Noise Candy – Stargazing With Ranger Bill (2002) Toneswoon
 Noise Candy – Sunflower Dairy Product (2002) Toneswoon
 Noise Candy – King Frankenstein (2002) Toneswoon
 Noise Candy – Console (2002) Toneswoon
 Noise Candy – Playtime (2002) Toneswoon
 Caliban and the Chrome Harmonium (2002) Almost Opaque
 Astral Motel (2002) Nelsonica convention CD Almost Opaque
 Whimsy (2003) Fabled Quixote
 Whimsy Two (A Garage Full of Clouds) (2003) Fabled Quixote
 The Romance of Sustain Volume One: Painting With Guitars (2003) Universal Twang
 Luxury Lodge (2003) Nelsonica convention CD Almost Opaque
 Plaything (2003) Universal Twang
 Dreamland To Starboard (2004) Universal Twang
 Custom Deluxe (2004) Universal Twang
 Satellite Songs (2004) Sonic Masonic
 Wah-Wah Galaxy (2004) Nelsonica convention CD Almost Opaque
 Rosewood: Ornaments and Graces for Acoustic Guitar Volume One (2005) Sonoluxe
 Rosewood: Ornaments and Graces for Acoustic Guitar Volume Two (2005) Sonoluxe
 Orpheus in Ultraland (2005) Nelsonica convention CD Discs of Ancient Odeon
 The Alchemical Adventures of Sailor Bill (2005) a coastal song suite by [Bill Nelson and his Lighthouse Signal Mechanism Orchestra] Sonoluxe
 Neptune's Galaxy (2006) Sonoluxe
 Return to Jazz of Lights (2006) Sonoluxe
 Arcadian Salon (2006) Nelsonica convention CD Discs of Ancient Odeon
 Gleaming Without Lights (2006) Sonoluxe
 Secret Club For Members Only (2007) Nelsonica convention CD Discs of Ancient Odeon
 And We Fell into a Dream (2007) Sonoluxe
 Silvertone Fountains (2008) Sonoluxe
 Illuminated at Dusk (2008) Sonoluxe
 Mazda Kaleidoscope (2008) Sonoluxe
 Clocks & Dials (2008) Nelsonica convention double CD Discs of Ancient Odeon
 Golden Melodies of Tomorrow (2008) Sonoluxe
 Fancy Planets (2009) Sonoluxe
 Here Comes Mr Mercury (2009) Sonoluxe
 The Dream Transmission Pavilion (2009) Nelsonica convention CD Discs of Ancient Odeon
 Theatre of Falling Leaves (2009) Sonoluxe
 Non-Stop Mystery Action (2009) Sonoluxe
 Picture Post (2010) Sonoluxe
 Modern Moods For Mighty Atoms (2010) Blue Shining Fountain Records
 Captain Future's Psychotronic Circus (2010) Nelsonica convention CD Discs of Ancient Odeon
 Fables And Dreamsongs (2010) Sonoluxe
 Fantasmatron (2011) Sonoluxe
 Hip Pocket JukeBox (2011) The Art School Ascended on Vapours of Roses art exhibition/concert CD
 Signals from Realms of Light (2011) Sonoluxe
 Model Village (2011) Sonoluxe Super Listener Series
 Songs of the Blossom Tree Optimists (2012) Sonoluxe Super Listener Series
 The Last of the Neon Cynics (2012) Enhanced CD includes PDF file of graphic novel by Matt Howarth Sonoluxe
 Joy Through Amplification (2012) Sonoluxe
 Return To Tomorrow (2012) Nelsonica convention CD Discs of Ancient Odeon
 The Palace of Strange Voltages (2012) Sonoluxe
 The Dreamshire Chronicles (2012) Sonoluxe
 Blip! (2013) Sonoluxe
 Blip!2 – The Tremulous Doo-Wah-Diddy (2013) Blip! Launch Party CD Sonoluxe
 Albion Dream Vortex (2013) Sonoluxe
 The Sparkle Machine (2013) Sonoluxe
 Pedalscope (2014) Sonoluxe
 Fantastic Guitars (2014) with Reeves Gabrels Sonoluxe
 Astroloops (2014) given away with extremely limited edition Eastwood 'Astroluxe Custom Ltd' guitar designed by Bill Nelson Astrotone
 Stereo Star Maps (2014) Sonoluxe
 Shining Reflector (2014) Sonoluxe
 Quiet Bells (2015) Sonoluxe
 Swoons And Levitations (2015) Sonoluxe
 The Years (2015) Sonoluxe
 Plectrajet: Painting With Guitars Volume Two (2015) Sonoluxe
 Electric Atlas (2015) Sonoluxe
 Loom (Astroloops Volume Two) (2015) Astrotone
 Perfect Monsters (2016) Sonoluxe
 Special Metal (2016) Tremolo Boy Records (digital download only)
 All That I Remember (2016) Sonoluxe Super Listener Series
 New Northern Dream (2016) Sonoluxe Super Listener Series
 Six String Super Apparatus: Painting With Guitars Volume Three (2016) Tremolo Boy Records (digital download only)
 The Awakening of Dr.Dream (2017) Tremolo Boy Records (digital download only)
 Kid Flip and the Golden Spacemen (2017) Tremolo Boy Records (digital download only)
 Luxury Wonder Moments (2017) Sonoluxe
 Tripping the Light Fantastic (2017) Sonoluxe
 Songs For Ghosts (2017) Sonoluxe
 That Old Mysterioso (2018) Sonoluxe
 The Unrealist (2018) Tremolo Boy Records (digital download only)
 Drive This Comet Across The Sky (2018) Tremolo Boy Records (digital download only)
 Dynamos and Tremolos (2018) Sonoluxe
 Auditoria (2018) Sonoluxe (triple CD to celebrate Bill Nelson's 70th birthday)
 Stand By: Light Coming (2019) Sonoluxe
 The Last Lamplighter (2019) Tremolo Boy Records (digital download only)
 Old Haunts (2019) Sonoluxe
 The Jewel (2020) Sonoluxe
 Transcorder the Acquitted By Mirrors recordings (2020) Sonoluxe
 New Vibrato Wonderland (2020) Sonoluxe
 Dazzlebox (2021) Sonoluxe
 Mixed Up Kid (2021) Sonoluxe
 My Private Cosmos (2021) 6-CD set, Sonoluxe
 Electra (In Search Of The Golden Sound) (2022) Sonoluxe
 Marvellous Realms (2023) Sonoluxe
 stupid/serious (2023) Sonoluxe

Singles
 "Teenage Archangel" / "Jets at Dawn" (1973) [Be-Bop Deluxe] Smile
 "Jet Silver and the Dolls of Venus" / "Third Floor Heaven" (1974) [Be-Bop Deluxe] Harvest
 "Between the Worlds" / "Lights" (1975) recalled after only one day of sale [Be-Bop Deluxe] Harvest
 "Maid in Heaven" / "Lights" (1975) [Be-Bop Deluxe] Harvest
 "Ships in the Night" / "Crying to the Sky" (1976) – UK No. 23 [Be-Bop Deluxe] Harvest
 "Kiss of Light" / "Shine" (1976) [Be-Bop Deluxe] Harvest
 "Japan" / "Futurist Manifesto" (1977) [Be-Bop Deluxe] Harvest
 "Panic in the World" / "Blue as a Jewel" (1978) [Be-Bop Deluxe] Harvest
 "Electrical Language" / "Surreal Estate" (1978) [Be-Bop Deluxe] Harvest
 "Furniture Music" / "Wonder Toys That Last For Ever", "Acquitted By Mirrors" (February 1979) [Bill Nelson's Red Noise] Harvest
 "Revolt into Style" / "Out of Touch" recorded live at Leicester De Montfort Hall 8 March 1979 (April 1979) [Bill Nelson's Red Noise] Harvest
 "Revolt into Style" / "Stay Young", "Out of Touch" both recorded live at Leicester De Montfort Hall 8 March 1979 12" (April 1979) [Bill Nelson's Red Noise] Harvest
 "Rooms With Brittle Views" / "Dada Guitare" (1980) Les Disques du Crépuscule
 "Do You Dream in Colour" / "Ideal Homes", "Instantly Yours", "Atom Man Loves Radium Girl" (1980) Cocteau
 To Heaven A Jet: "Airfields" / "Tony Goes To Tokyo (And Rides The Bullet Train)" (1981) [The Revox Cadets] Cocteau 
 "Youth of Nation on Fire" / "Be My Dynamo" (1981) Mercury
 "Youth of Nation on Fire" / "Be My Dynamo" / "Rooms With Brittle Views" / "All My Wives Were Iron" (1981) Mercury 
 "Living in My Limousine" / "Birds of Tin", "Love in the Abstract" (1981) Mercury 
 "Living in My Limousine (Remix)", "White Sounds" / "Birds of Tin", "Love in the Abstract" 12" (1981) Mercury 
 "Banal" / "Mr. Magnetism Himself" (1981) Mercury 
 "Banal" / "Turn To Fiction" / "Hers Is A Lush Situation" / "Mr. Magnetism Himself" 12" (1981) Mercury 
 "Eros Arriving" / "Haunting in My Head" (1982) Mercury 
 "Eros Arriving" / "Haunting in My Head" / "He And Sleep Were Brothers" / "Flesh" (1982) Mercury
 "Flaming Desire" / "The Passion" (1982) Mercury 
 "Flaming Desire" (Long Version) / "The Passion", "The Burning Question" 12" (1982) Mercury 
 Flaming Desire And Other Passions: "Flaming Desire" (Long Version), "Flesh" / "The Passion", "The Burning Question", "He And Sleep Were Brothers", "Haunting in My Head" 12" (1982) PVC 
 "Sleepcycle", "Konny Buys A Kodak" / "When The Birds Return", "The Beat That Can't Go Wrong Today" EP 33 1/3 RPM (1982) Acquitted By Mirrors (ABM) fan club release Cocteau
 "King of the Cowboys", "Shadowland" / "Carnival", "Spring" EP 33 1/3 RPM (1982) ABM release Cocteau
 "Touch And Glow" / "Dancing in the Wind", "Love Without Fear" (1982) Cocteau
 "The World And His Wife" / "Dream Car Romantics (In Death's Garage Antics)", "Dancing Music" EP 33 1/3 RPM (1982) ABM release Cocteau
 "Dancing on a Knife's Edge" / "Indiscretion", "Contemplation" EP 33 1/3 RPM (1983) ABM release Cocteau
 "Acceleration" Remixed by John Luongo / "Hard Facts From The Fiction Department" (1984) Cocteau
 "Hard Facts From The Fiction Department", "Acceleration Dub" Remixed by John Luongo / "Acceleration Long Version" Remixed by John Luongo, "Acceleration Short Version" Remixed by John Luongo 12" (1984) Cocteau
'Giants of the Perpetual Wurlitzer: "The Strangest Things, The Strangest Times", "Phantom Gardens", "French Promenades" / "Golden Mile", "West-Deep", "Threnolia" EP 33 1/3 RPM (1984) ABM release Cocteau
 "Hard Facts From The Fiction Department", "Daily Bells" / "Rhythm Unit", "Junc-Sculpture" EP 33 1/3 RPM (1984) ABM release Cocteau
 The Cote D'Azur EP: "A Dream Fulfilled", "Familiar Spirit" / "Palais Des Marine", "Letter To Jacques Maritan", "Villefranche Interior" EP 33 1/3 RPM (1984) ABM release Cocteau
 Sex-Psyche-Etc: "Sex, Psyche Etcetera" / "Several Famous Orchestras", "Who He Is" 12" (1985) [Orchestra Arcana] Cocteau
 "Wildest Dreams" / "Self Impersonisation" (1986) Portrait
 "Wildest Dreams (Wild Mix)", "Self Impersonisation" / "Wildest Dreams (Single Version)", "The Yo-Yo Dyne" 12" (1986) Portrait
 "Secret Ceremony (Theme From Brond)" / "Wiping A Tear From The All Seeing Eye" 7" and 12" versions (1987) [Scala Featuring Bill Nelson & Daryl Runswick] Cocteau
 Ecclesia Gnostica (Music for the Interior Church): "Set Me As A Seal Upon Thine Heart", "Mysterium", "Katharos", "Day of Eternity", "Evening Adoration" / "Ecclesia Gnostica", "Young Angels by an Ancient River", "Finis Gloria Mundi" (1987) bonus release with Chance Encounters in the Garden of Lights first edition Cocteau
 "Do You Dream in Colour" / "Life in Your Hands" (1989) Cocteau
 "Life in Your Hands", "Do You Dream in Colour" / "Get Out of That Hole", "My Dream Demon" 12" (1989) Cocteau
 "The Dead We Wake With Upstairs Drums", "Boat To Forever", "So It Goes" CD (1992) Venture
 "Contemplation 2007" / "The Dreamsville Poetry Experiment" (2007) no label (digital download only)
 "I Hear Electricity" / "Kiss You Slowly" (2008) Sonoluxe (digital download only)
 "The Jingler" (2009) Christmas single no label (digital download only)
 "Frost-O-Matic" .wav (2010) Christmas single Sonoluxe (digital download only)
 "Think And You’ll Miss It" / "Beat Street" (2012) Christmas single no label (digital download only)
 "Snow Is Falling" (2014) Christmas single no label (digital download only)

DVDs
flashlight dreams... and fleeting shadows an audio-optical diary by Bill Nelson (2003) Voiceprint
Picture House (2010) Nelsonica convention DVD Visuluxe
Classic Rock Magazine Legends Bill Nelson and the Gentlemen Rocketeers filmed live at Metropolis Studios (2011) [Bill Nelson and the Gentlemen Rocketeers] ITV Studios Home Entertainment
Be-Bop Deluxe at the BBC 1974–78 (2013) [Be-Bop Deluxe] 3-CD + DVD box set of previously unreleased material + material from Tramcar To Tomorrow (most tracks) and Tremulous Antenna (all tracks) + televised performances EMI

Compilation albums
 The Best of and the Rest of Be-Bop Deluxe (1978) [Be-Bop Deluxe] 2-LP set; second disc material previously unreleased on LP – Drastic Plastic outtakes plus single A- and B-sides Harvest
 Singles A's & B's (1981) [Be-Bop Deluxe] Harvest Heritage
 Vistamix (1984) Portrait (10 tracks – Chimera mini LP, two tracks from The Love That Whirls, one from Quit Dreaming And Get on the Beam, and one single)
 The Two-Fold Aspect of Everything (1984) 2-LP set of A- and B-sides previously unavailable on LP Cocteau
 Bop to the Red Noise (1986) [Be-Bop Deluxe] mixture of BBD and RN material Dojo 
 The Strangest Things A Collection of Recordings 1979–1989 (1989) Enigma
 The Best of Be-Bop Deluxe: Raiding The Divine Archive (1990) [Be-Bop Deluxe] Harvest
 Air Age Anthology: The Very Best of Be-Bop Deluxe (1997) [Be-Bop Deluxe] 2-CD set EMI
 The Very Best of Be-Bop Deluxe (1998) [Be-Bop Deluxe] EMI-Capitol Special Markets
 What Now, What Next? The Cocteau Years Compendium (1998) Discipline Global Mobile
 Electrotype – The Holyground Recordings 1968–1972 (2001) previously unreleased pre-Northern Dream BN and pre-Axe Victim BBD recordings Holyground
 Postcards From the Future... Introducing Be-Bop Deluxe (2004) [Be-Bop Deluxe] EMI
 Futurist Manifesto (2011) [Be-Bop Deluxe] 5-CD set, 1st four discs are the five BBD studio albums plus the singles; fifth disc is previously unreleased material from demos and Live! In The Air Age recordings Harvest
 The Practice of Everyday Life  (2011) 8-CD set, 40-year career retrospective mixture of BBD, RN and BN solo material Esoteric Recordings
 Original Albums Series (2014) [Be-Bop Deluxe] 5-CD set, five discs are the five BBD studio albums, tracks as originally released on LP Warner/Parlophone
 The Dreamer's Companion Vol 1 (How I Got My Secret Powers) (2015) Sonoluxe (digital download only)
 The Dreamer's Companion Vol 2 (In This I Reveal My Secret Identity) (2015) Sonoluxe (digital download only)
 The Dreamer's Companion Vol 3 (Songs of the Bel-Air Rocketman) (2015) introductory compilation of 14 tracks per each of 3 volumes taken from rare and limited edition CD pressings, personally chosen by Bill Nelson himself Sonoluxe (digital download only)

Compilation albums with other artists
 Future Perfect includes tracks from Practically Wired or how I became…Guitarboy! and Automatic [Channel Light Vessel] (1995) [Various Artists] All Saints

Compilation singles
 Hot Valves: "Maid in Heaven", "Bring Back The Spark" / "Blazing Apostles", "Jet Silver and the Dolls of Venus" EP (1976) UK No. 36 Harvest
 Permanent Flame (The Beginners Guide To Bill Nelson) (1983) 5-disc set of previously released BBD, RN and BN solo material Cocteau

Albums as producer
 Days in Europa (1st release version) — producer and keyboards (1979) Skids Virgin
 Warriors — Nelson removed his producer credit following creative differences with Numan; "guitar and keyboards" credit remains (1983) Gary Numan Beggars Banquet Records* 
 New Way To Move — producer, guitar, synthesizer (1983) The Units 6-track mini-LP Epic
 Heaven & Hell Volume 2 (a Velvet Underground tribute album) — production and keyboard solo on "Pale Blue Eyes" The Mock Turtles, also "Lonesome Cowboy Bill" Bill Nelson & The Roy Rogers Rocketeers (1990) Imaginary
 Lovesnake — producer (1991) Jean Park Epic
 Willerby — production, guitars, sitar, keyboards, also features Ian Nelson on saxes and clarinet (1991) The Rhythm Sisters Imaginary
 The Familiar (1992) Roger Eno with Kate St John All Saints
 Geography — produced by Culturemix, Nelson also plays guitar, all compositions Yumiko Norika (1993) Culturemix Japanese release Voice Records
 Listen — producer (1983) A Flock of Seagulls Jive
 Culturemix with Bill Nelson — produced with Yumiko Norika, Nelson also plays guitar, keyboards, occasional piano, occasional vocals, all compositions Yumiko Norika except "Four Postcards Home" by Bill Nelson and Yumiko Norika (1995) Culturemix Resurgence
 Lines of Desire — 10 tracks in total: played on three of which he produced two (1995) Su Lyn Bruce's Fingers
 360 Degrees — produced with Gillcover and the Monkey (1996) [Gillcover and the Monkey] Japanese release Stillwaters / Sony Music Japan
 Яблокитай / Yablokitay — Nelson also plays guitar (1997) Наутилус Помпилиус / Nautilus Pompilius Russian release Dana Music
 Leaving the Electric Circus — Nelson also plays guitar on and helped write "The Sunglass" (2002) Sea of Wires Sea of Wires self-released
 Animals They Dream About — (2016, recorded 1982) The Units Futurismo

Singles as producer
 "Working for the Yankee Dollar" / "Vanguards Crusade" — (1979) [Skids] Virgin
 "Charade" / "Grey Parade" — producer, keyboards and co-authorship with Stuart Adamson / Richard Jobson (1979) [Skids] Virgin
 "Animation" / "Pros & Cons" — (1980) [Skids] Virgin
 "Losing You" / "You Don't Turn Me on Anymore" — (1981) [Stranger Than Fiction] Ambergris Records
 "Novel Romance" / "In A Glass Eye" — produced A-side only (1981) Nash the Slash Dindisc
 "Telecommunication" / "Intro" — produced A-side only (1981) A Flock of Seagulls Jive Records
 "(It's Not Me) Talking" / "Tanglimara" — produced A-side only (1983) [A Flock of Seagulls] Jive Records
 "Sister Surprise" / "Poetry And Power" — also guitars, keyboards, backing vocals (1983) [Gary Numan] Beggars Banquet
 "Warriors" / "My Car Slides" — also guitars, keyboards (1983) [Gary Numan] Beggars Banquet
 "Infotainment" / "Please Mr Postman" — production, guitar, keyboards (1990) [The Rhythm Sisters] Imaginary
 "Rain" production, guitar / "She Rides" — sitar (1990) [The Rain Poets] Scorp Records
 "Magic Boomerang" / "Take Your Time" — (1990) [The Mock Turtles] Imaginary
 Pink & Clean "Cheap Thrill Star", "Pink & Clean", "Girlie", "A Monster of Me" EP — (1998) [Honeytone Cody] Elle & Elliot Nelson
 Believe in the Promise of Tomorrow — contributed secret track which consisted of music he wrote that the band played before their gigs EP (2000) [Honeytone Cody]

Compilation albums as producer
 Sweet Suburbia — worked on featured tracks, a Best of compilation (1995) [Skids] Virgin

Albums as collaborator
 Disguise in Love guitar on 3 tracks "(I don't want to) Be Nice", "Readers Wives", "Health Fanatic" (1978) John Cooper Clarke CBS
 Days in Europa (2nd release version) keyboards by Bill Nelson, additional production, remix by Bruce Fairbairn (1980) Skids Virgin
 La Rocca! synthesizer (1981) [Snips] EMI, UK
 Third Eye E-bow guitars, electric guitar (1982) Monsoon Phonogram
 Rice Music "flying e-bow" guitar (1982) Masami Tsuchiya Epic
 What Me Worry? guitars, vocals (1982) Yukihiro Takahashi Japanese release Yen / Alfa, UK release Alfa
 Tomorrow's Just Another Day guitar on "This Island Earth", guitar and backing vocals on "Are You Receiving Me" (remix) (1983) [Yukihiro Takahashi] Japanese release Yen / Alfa
 Naughty Boys guitar (1983) Yellow Magic Orchestra Alfa
 Naughty Boys Instrumental guitar (1984) [Yellow Magic Orchestra] Alfa
 Time and Place guitars, vocals, live (1984) [Yukihiro Takahashi] Japanese release Yen / Alfa
 Wild and Moody guitar, vocal on "Helpless" (Neil Young) and "Bounds of Reason, Bonds of Love" (lyrics: Nelson; music: Nelson, Takahashi) mini-LP (1984) [Yukihiro Takahashi] Japanese release Yen / Alfa, UK release Cocteau
 Viva Lava Liva lyrics on "Walk Away" (1984) Sandii & the Sunsetz Japanese release Yen / Alfa
 Gone To Earth solo electric / acoustic guitars on "Before The Bullfight", guitar on "Wave", "Silver Moon", "The Healing Place", acoustic guitar on "Answered Prayers" (1986) David Sylvian Virgin
 Code guitar on "Don't Argue", "Here To Go", "Trouble (Won't Stop)", "White Car", "No One Here", "Here to Go (Little Dub)" (1987) Cabaret Voltaire Parlophone UK
 Still Looking For Heaven on Earth guitar on: "Burning Rain", "This Means Everything To Me", "Feel The Fire", "Heaven Said My Name", "Shake (Sell Your Soul)" (1988) [Crazy House] Chrysalis Records US
 Ego lyrics on "Only the Heart Has Heard" (1988) [Yukihiro Takahashi] Japanese release Eastworld
 Gagalactyca guitar on  "Cold Tired & Hungry" [Chris Coombs & Lightyears Away/Thundermother] (1990) Holyground 
 By the Dawn's Early Light guitar on tracks 1–14, composed track 13 "The Place of Dead Roads" (1991) Harold Budd Opal Records
 Rain Tree Crow guitar on 3 tracks "Big Wheels in Shanty Town", "Blackwater", "Blackcrow Hits Shoe Shine City" (1991) Rain Tree Crow Virgin
 Chill and Kiss guitar on "Love So Terse", "Get It On", "This Song in You", "Get Stoned", Ian Nelson sax on "Togetherness Blues", Ian Leese (After The Satellite Sings, Excellent Spirits Channel Light Vessel)] bass (1992) Ramon Tikaram German release DSB (Deutsche Schallplatten GmbH Berlin)
 地上の楽園 / Chizyou No Rakuen / Paradise on Earth guitar, lyrics on "Hope" (1994) [久石譲 / Joe Hisaishi] Japanese release Pioneer 
 The Way Out Is The Way In guitar on "Music & Cosmic (Feel Yourself)" (sampled from Channel Light Vessel's Automatic) (1995) [Audio Active & Laraaji] All Saints
 Alienshamanism guitar solo on "Alienshamanism – Prologue", flamenco guitar solo on "Flamenco Luminoso", guitars and ebo (sic) guitars on "Desire Machine" (2000) Dr.Jan (guru) Nap
 Selected Esoterica (2003) [Dr.Jan (guru)] Kaerucafe
 Communion (2003) Jan Linton/Dr.Jan (guru)] Explosion
 Monsoon Featuring Sheila Chandra E-bow guitars, electric guitar, re-release of Third Eye includes several previously unreleased tracks (1995) [Monsoon] Mercury Records
 Dreams And Absurdities (2015) Dave Sturt Esoteric/Antenna

Singles as collaborator
 "Are You Receiving Me" / "And I Believe in You" guitar, backing vocals (1982) [Yukihiro Takahashi] Japanese release Yen / Alfa
 "Wings of the Dawn" / "Ever So Lonely", "And I You" e-bow guitar 7", 12" (1982) [Monsoon] Phonogram
 "Tomorrow Never Knows" / "Indian Princess" guitar and "base" (sic) 7", 12" (1982) [Monsoon] Phonogram
 "Stranger Things Have Happened" / "Bounds of Reason, Bonds of Love" vocals, guitar, keyboards "Metaphysical Jerks" guitar, keyboards, writer 12" (1985) [Yukihiro Takahashi] Cocteau
 "Castles in Spain" / "A Gathering", "Ring Those Bells" co-writer with The Armoury Show on "Ring Those Bells" only 12" (1985) The Armoury Show Parlophone
 The Eternal Desire Machines of Dr Jan guitars and ebo (sic) guitars on "Desire Machine (dance meditation)" EP (1999) [Dr.Jan (guru)] Global Vision Music
 Three White Roses & A Budd: "No Shade, No Shadow", "Adrift Amidst Les Odalisques", "The Airless Time", "Blue Locus" EP (2002) Harold Budd, Bill Nelson & Fila Brazillia Twentythree Records

Compilation albums as collaborator
 A to Austr (Musics From Holy Ground) (1970) [Various Artists] Holyground
 Astral Navigations guitar on 3 tracks by Light Years Away  "Yesterday", "Today (North Country Cinderella)", "Tomorrow (Buffalo)" (1971) A-side: [Light Years Away], B-side: [Thundermother] Holyground
 87–90 includes "Magic Boomerang", "Take Your Time" [The Mock Turtles] also released as single (1990) [Various Artists] Imaginary
 Gagalactyca guitar, recorded from Holyground sessions 1968–1970 (1990) [Various Artists] Holyground
 Loose Routes guitar, recorded from Holyground sessions, includes Global Village's "Global Fantasy" (a re-working of Traffic's "Dear Mr. Fantasy") and other tracks 1968–1970 (1990) [Various Artists] 2-LP Holyground
 Drop 5 (The Liquid Side of Dance) guitar (possibly just a guitar sample) also features David Torn, Richard Barbieri, Brian Eno, Jah Wobble, Steve Jansen, Hector Zazou, possibly David Sylvian (1998) [Various Artists] Italian release Materiali Sonori
 communion ii download compilation (2015?) [Jan Linton] Burning Shed

Bibliography
Nelson, Bill diary of a hyperdreamer (2004) Bill Nelson's collected diaries from between 1999 and 2003, previously published on his official website Pomona 
Nelson, Bill Painted From Memory (Sketches for an Autobiography) Volume One: Evocation of a Radiant Childhood (2010) Autumn Ink Incorporated self-published
Nelson, Bill diary of a hyperdreamer vol.2 (2015) Bill Nelson's collected diaries from between 2005 and 2006, previously published on his official website Pomona 
Reeves, Paul Sutton Music in Dreamland Bill Nelson & Be-Bop Deluxe (2008) Helter Skelter publishing

References

External links
Official website
William's Study (Diary Of A Hyperdreamer): Nelson's online diary 2015-2005
Permanent Flame – an archive of a previous Nelson site with more content 
Holyground Records website – details of Nelson's early work
Gilby, Ian 1984/1985 interview in Home Studio Recording magazine detailing Nelson's then leading edge of multi-track home recording technology
Sound on Sound website – search results for Bill Nelson (news items, articles)

 – first shown at the launch party for New Northern Dream album, a series of photographs of Nelson throughout the years, together with a selection of his music from the 21st century

20th-century English painters
English male painters
21st-century English painters
1948 births
Art rock musicians
Be-Bop Deluxe members
Bill Nelson's Red Noise members
Caroline Records artists
Discipline Global Mobile artists
English electronic musicians
English experimental musicians
English rock guitarists
English male guitarists
English songwriters
English record producers
English new wave musicians
Enigma Records artists
Glam rock musicians
Harvest Records artists
Imaginary Records artists
Living people
Musicians from Wakefield
Virgin Records artists
British male songwriters
20th-century English male artists
21st-century English male artists